The Institute for Clinical Social Work (ICSW) is an independent educational institution in Chicago, Illinois, that provides practicing clinical social workers and other psychotherapists the opportunity to earn an MA or Ph.D. without taking a break from their professional pursuits. ICSW was established in 1981 and comprises more than 40 faculty members, 110 students, and 150 graduates.

Academics
The Institute for Clinical Social Work is fully accredited by the Higher Learning Commission.

References

1981 establishments in Illinois
Educational institutions established in 1981
Schools of social work in the United States
Universities and colleges in Chicago
Graduate schools in the United States
Private universities and colleges in Illinois